|

Sandra Gasser (born 27 July 1962 in Bern) is a retired Swiss track and field athlete who specialised in middle distance running.

After the 1987 World Championships, where she achieved third place in the 1500 metres, she failed a doping test and was disqualified. After her two-year ban she rejoined the world elite and picked up the bronze medal at both the 1990 European Championships and 1993 World Indoor Championships, although in the final of the latter she fell before the finish line.

Sandra Gasser won seven Swiss championship titles, and still holds the Swiss national record at 800 metres. She is 1.71 m tall (5'7") and her competition weight was 52 kg (114 lb).

International competitions

Personal bests 
 800 m: 1:58.90 min, 21 June 1987 in Berlin, Swiss record (ran 1:58.65 in 1990, unofficial because it was in a men's race)
 1500 m: 4:01.10 min, 4 July 1987 in Oslo
 3000 m: 8:54.13 min, 12 July 1990 in Lausanne

See also
List of sportspeople sanctioned for doping offences

References 

1962 births
Living people
Sportspeople from Bern
Swiss female middle-distance runners
European Athletics Championships medalists
World Athletics Championships athletes for Switzerland
Doping cases in athletics
Swiss sportspeople in doping cases
Athletes stripped of World Athletics Championships medals